MS Ruahine was a passenger ship that operated in the mid-20th century, primarily for the New Zealand Shipping Company.

Built by John Brown & Company for the New Zealand Shipping Company, she was launched on 11 December 1950 and entered service in May 1951.  She operated in combined passenger and cargo trade from London to Auckland and Wellington, arriving in New Zealand in November 1951. At the end of 1966, she was transferred to the fleet of New Zealand Shipping subsidiary Federal Line, but operated under the British flag for only one more year, making her final New Zealand voyage in late 1967. She was subsequently sold to the Orient Overseas Line and renamed Oriental Rio, sailing under the Hong Kong flag until she was scrapped in 1974.

She had a passenger capacity of 267 in a single-class configuration.

References

1950 ships
Ships of the New Zealand Shipping Company
Passenger ships of the United Kingdom
Ships of Hong Kong